Clostridium cocleatum is a Gram-positive and anaerobic bacterium from the genus Clostridium which has been isolated from the caecal content of a mouse in Miyazaki in Japan.

References

Further reading
 

 

Bacteria described in 1979
cocleatum